The 83rd Group Army, formerly the 54th Group Army, is a military formation of the Chinese People's Liberation Army Ground Forces (PLAGF). The 83rd Group Army is one of twelve total group armies of the PLAGF, the largest echelon of ground forces in the People's Republic of China, and one of three assigned to the nation's Central Theater Command.

History 
130th Division took part with the army in the Korean War.
In 1959, it participated in Tibet insurgency operations. It participated in the Sino-Indian War of 1962. In 1979, it participated in the Sino-Vietnamese War along the Western battle line. At that time the 127th division commander was Zhang Wannian, later the vice chairman of the Central Military Commission. The 127th division captured the town of Lang Son, defeating the Vietnamese army main force. In 1985, the 54th Army reorganized into one of the People's Liberation Army's three rapid response (strategic reserve) armies (the other two being the 38th Army and the 39th Army), which belongs to the forces. Troops from the army were deployed into Beijing in June 1989 and participated in the anti-protester clearance operations. In February 2016, the seven military regions were reorganised into five theater commands, as part of the 2015 People's Republic of China military reform, 54th Army belongs to Central Theater Command. In 2017, in an adjustment and establishment of military units, the 83rd Army was reorganized based on the 54th Army.

Organization
In 1985, the 127th Division transferred into the army. The 161st Division was reorganised as an  artillery brigade. After 1998, the 127th Infantry Division was converted to a light mechanized infantry division, and the 160th infantry division reorganised as a motorized brigade. In 2009, the 162nd Infantry Division converted to a mechanized wheeled infantry division, using 8x8 wheeled vehicles.

The army comprises:
127th Light Mechanized Infantry Division
Light Mechanized Infantry Division
160th Mechanized Infantry Brigade (99G main battle tank, 04A type infantry fighting vehicle)
11th Armored Brigade
Artillery brigade (PHL03 300 mm long-range rockets, HJ9 self-anti-tank missiles)
Air defense brigade

Today it includes the 162nd Motorized Infantry Division, the 127th Lt Mech Infantry Division, the 11th Armored Division (Xinyang, Henan), an artillery brigade, the 1st Air Defense Brigade, and the 1st Army Aviation Regiment. The former 160th Infantry Brigade appears to have been deactivated in 2003.

Commanders
Ding Sheng (1952.10-1955.12)
Ouyang Jiaxiang (1955.12-1957.09)
Ding Sheng (1957.09-1964.09)
Wei Tongtai (1964.09-1969.06)
Han Huaizhi (1969.06-1980.05)
Li Jiulong (1980.05-1985.06)
Zhu Chao (1985.08-1990.06)
Liang Guanglie (1990.06-1993.12)
Zhang Xianglin (1993.12-1998.12)
Huang Hanbiao (1998.12-2006.08)
Song Puxuan (2006.08-2009.02)
Rong Guiqing (2009.02-2014.12)
Shi Zhenglu (2014.12-2017.04)
Xie Zenggang

References 

Field armies of the People's Liberation Army
Jinan Military Region
Xinxiang